Reinhardt-Craig House, Kiln and Pottery Shop is a historic home, kiln, and pottery shop located near Vale, Lincoln County, North Carolina.  The house, kiln and pottery shop, were built by Harvey Reinhardt between 1933 and 1936. The house is a one-story, rectangular frame building, two bays wide by three bays deep.  It has a front gable roof and a shed-roofed, full-width, front porch. The kiln is a traditional, wood-fired, alkaline glaze groundhog cross-draft kiln that includes a firebox, arch, and chimney, all made of brick. It measures 24 feet, 11 inches long by 11 feet, 6 inches wide.  The one-story shop is a frame structure with a side-gabled tin roof and wood clapboard siding.   Also on the property is a contributing pugmill built in 1949.  The pottery was a producer of traditional Catawba Valley Pottery and associated with Burlon Craig (ca. 1914–2002).

It was listed on the National Register of Historic Places in 2008.

References

Industrial buildings and structures on the National Register of Historic Places in North Carolina
Houses on the National Register of Historic Places in North Carolina
Industrial buildings completed in 1936
Houses completed in 1936
Houses in Lincoln County, North Carolina
National Register of Historic Places in Lincoln County, North Carolina